Big Bad Jug is an album by saxophonist Gene Ammons recorded in 1972 and released on the Prestige label.

Reception
Allmusic awarded the album 2 stars with its review by Scott Yanow stating, "The repertoire, which includes a couple of funky originals... is not too inspiring... but Ammons makes the best of it".

Track listing 
All compositions by Gene Ammons except where noted.
 "Lady Mama" – 6:52     
 "I Can't Help Myself" (Lamont Dozier, Brian Holland, Eddie Holland) – 4:13      
 "Lucille" (Little Richard, Harold Vick) – 4:55      
 "Fly Me" – 3:10     
 "Big Bad Jug" – 7:46     
 "Papa Was a Rollin' Stone" (Norman Whitfield, Barrett Strong) – 4:31      
 "Fuzz" (Dave Grusin) – 4:27

Recorded at Van Gelder Studio in Englewood Cliffs, New Jersey on October 28, 1972 (tracks 4 & 7), November 30, 1972 (tracks 3 & 4) and November 1, 1972 (tracks 2 & 7)

Personnel 
Gene Ammons – tenor saxophone
Ernie Hayes – organ (tracks 4, 5 & 7)
Hank Jones – electric piano (tracks 4, 5 & 7)
Sonny Phillips – piano, organ (tracks 1-3 & 6)
Joe Beck (tracks 4, 5 & 7), Maynard Parker (tracks 1-3 & 6) – guitar
Ron Carter – bass, electric bass
Billy Cobham (tracks 1-3 & 6), Idris Muhammad (tracks 4 & 7), Mickey Roker (track 5) – drums

References 

Gene Ammons albums
1972 albums
Prestige Records albums
Albums produced by Ozzie Cadena
Albums recorded at Van Gelder Studio